Oddvar Kruge (17 April 1926 – 29 October 2015) was a Norwegian footballer. He played in one match for the Norway national football team in 1951.

References

External links
 

1926 births
2015 deaths
Norwegian footballers
Norway international footballers
Association football defenders
People from Larvik
Sportspeople from Vestfold og Telemark